City: analysis of urban trends, culture, theory, policy, action is a peer-reviewed academic journal that publishes research, analysis, and commentary relating to cities, their futures, and urbanization. The journal was established in 1996, but ran out of money in 1997. It was relaunched in 2000. The journal is published by Routledge and its editors are 
Pushpa Arabindoo, Melissa Fernández-Arrigoitia, Andrea Gibbons, Debbie Humphry, Michele Lancione, David Madden, Anna Richter and Antonis Vradis. The journal's founding editor is Bob Catterall.

Abstracting and indexing 
The journal is abstracted and indexed in:
 Cambridge Scientific Abstracts
 Dietrich's Index Philosophicus
 EBSCOhost
 International Bibliography of the Social Sciences
 Scopus

References

External links 
 

Urban studies and planning journals
Geography journals
Routledge academic journals
English-language journals
Bimonthly journals